Park Byeong-yun (19 April 1941 – 14 September 2022) was a South Korean politician. A member of the Millennium Democratic Party, he served in the National Assembly from 2000 to 2004.

Park died on 14 September 2022, at the age of 81.

References

1941 births
2022 deaths
21st-century South Korean politicians
Members of the National Assembly (South Korea)
Democratic Party (South Korea, 2000) politicians
Seoul National University alumni
South Korean journalists
People from Naju